Gianni Gambi (also Giovanni; 6 September 1907 – 18 May 1986) was an Italian swimmer who competed in the 1500 m freestyle at the 1928 Summer Olympics. After the Olympics he changed to open water swimming, together with his brother Cecco, and in the 1930s competed in Canada and the United States. In 1948 he crossed the English Channel in 12 hours and 40 minutes. Next year he swam 21 miles between Naples and Capri in 15 hours.

References

External links
 

1907 births
1986 deaths
Italian male long-distance swimmers
Olympic swimmers of Italy
Swimmers at the 1928 Summer Olympics
Sportspeople from Ravenna
Italian male freestyle swimmers
20th-century Italian people